"Love No Limit" is a song by American recording artist Mary J. Blige. It was co-written by Kenny Greene and Dave "Jam" Hall for her debut album, What's the 411? (1992), while production was overseen by Hall. Released as the album's fourth and final single, the song became a top five hit, reaching number-five on the US R&B singles chart, and peaked at number forty-four on the US Billboard Hot 100 chart. Hall has stated in interviews, that he wanted to give the song an urban, hip-hop feel to a much more jazzy sound, when it was created.

R&B singer Monica sang the song as a tribute at the Essence Awards 2003. Blige later performed the song at the 3rd BET Honors in 2010, as part of a medley of her hits, when she paid tribute to honoree Diddy. The song was also briefly played in the  American comedy film CB4 (1993) starring Chris Rock.

Critical reception
In an retrospective review, Daryl McIntosh from Albumism stated that the "emotional love ballad" "Love No Limit", "reinforced Blige's versatility and ability to deliver in the more traditional R&B format." J.D. Considine from The Baltimore Sun remarked the "gentle, jazzy cadences" of the song. Larry Flick from Billboard wrote, "Once again, her sultry, delightfully seasoned voice melts into a jazzy hip-hop groove. Romantic, swaying gem could become an instant fave at several radio formats. Give in to it." Mark Kinchen for Music Weeks RM Dance Update commented, "Imagine a smoke-filled jazz club with Blige singing in a deep seductive voice over a very smooth basic R&B track. You've got the picture." Jonathan Bernstein from Spin complimented its "irresistible bounce".

Music video 
The song's accompanying music video for "Love No Limit" was directed by American director Millicent Shelton. It marked the acting debut of British actor Adewale Akinnuoye-Agbaje, who later starred on the television series Lost. In the black-and-white video Blige is singing in a club.

Remix version
In the official remix version, which is found on her What's the 411? Remix album, the song opens with a snippet of the original version, then the remix begins with Blige singing it in alternative way: the main beat takes a sample of Keni Burke's "Risin' to the Top" and the 1982 The Gap Band hit "Outstanding" while refraining Anita Baker's 1988 song "Good Love".

Tracklisting

 US Cassette single US 7" single "Love No Limit" (Radio Edit) – 4:10
 "Love No Limit" (Instrumental) – 4:59

 US Cassette maxi-single US CD single "Love No Limit" (Puffy Daddy Mix) – 3:57
 "Love No Limit" (Bad Boy Mix) – 3:56
 "Love No Limit" (Jazz) – 4:12
 "Love No Limit" (Hip Hop) – 4:07

 US 12" single'''
 "Love No Limit" (Puffy Daddy Mix) – 3:57
 "Love No Limit" (Jazz) – 4:12
 "Love No Limit" (Hip Hop) – 4:07

Credits and personnel
Credits adapted from the What's the 411?'' liner notes.

 Sean "Puffy" Combs – executive producer
 Charlie Davis – executive producer
 Kenneth Greene – lyrics
 Dave "Jam" Hall – producer
 Kurt Woodley – executive producer

Charts

Weekly charts

Year-end charts

References

Mary J. Blige songs
1993 songs
Songs written by Kenny Greene
1992 songs
Songs written by Dave Hall (record producer)
Song recordings produced by Dave Hall (record producer)
Uptown Records singles